Erythrina burttii is a flowering plant species in the genus of Erythrina found in Kenya and Ethiopia.

E. burttii contains flavonoids with antimicrobial properties. 7-O-Methylluteone, a prenylated isoflavone, can be found in the bark. The isoflav-3-enes burttinol-A and burttinol-C, and the 2-arylbenzofuran derivative burttinol-D, also found in the root bark, show an antiplasmodial activity.

References 

burtii